Grosse Pointe is a city in Wayne County in the U.S. state of Michigan.  As of the 2010 census, the city had a population of 5,421.

Grosse Pointe is an eastern suburb of Metro Detroit along Lake St. Clair.  It is located along East Jefferson Avenue and shares a small northwestern border with the city of Detroit.  It is one of five cities within the Grosse Pointe area.  Grosse Pointe was originally incorporated as a village in 1880 and again as a city in 1934.

History
It was incorporated as a city in 1934. There are five Grosse Pointes: Grosse Pointe Park, Grosse Pointe City, Grosse Pointe Farms, Grosse Pointe Woods and Grosse Pointe Shores.

Together with Grosse Pointe Park and Grosse Pointe Farms, the city comprises part of the southern Pointes, which are older and more densely populated than the northern Pointes (Grosse Pointe Woods and Grosse Pointe Shores). It became heavily populated between 1910 and 1930 as one of Detroit's first commuter suburbs; in the previous century, Grosse Pointe was home to cottages, resorts, farms, and widely spaced lakefront mansions. Grosse Pointe ("the City"), Grosse Pointe Farms, and Grosse Pointe Park make up the Grosse Pointe South High School district. Grosse Pointe Woods and Grosse Pointe Shores make up the Grosse Pointe North High School district. Downtown Grosse Pointe, along Kercheval Avenue from Neff to Cadieux, nicknamed "The Village," is considered by many locals to be the central downtown for all five of the Grosse Pointes, although each of them (except Grosse Pointe Shores) has several blocks of retail properties.

Geography
The water is part of Lake St. Clair.

The street layout of Grosse Pointe is basically a grid inside of its Cadieux, Mack, and Fisher Road boundaries. Some streets offer large backyards, such as Washington and Lakeland, while other streets are more compact.

Most of the largest homes are within a few blocks of the lakefront; there are several blocks of mansions south of Kercheval Avenue. Predominant architecture includes the neo-Georgian, Tudor revival, Dutch Colonial, and arts and crafts styles. Some Victorian homes and traditional bungalow homes can also be found, mostly just north and south of the Village retail district. Some blocks, generally just south of the Village, have townhouses and apartments. Most of these were built in the 1920s, and can be seen along St. Paul, Maumee, and Jefferson avenues, mostly west of Rivard Boulevard, and between Notre Dame and Cadieux south of the Village retail district.

There are retail and low-rise office buildings along Kercheval Avenue in the Village district, on Fisher Road near Grosse Pointe South High School, and along Mack Avenue bordering Detroit.

Climate
This climatic region is typified by large seasonal temperature differences, with warm to hot (and often humid) summers and cold (sometimes severely cold) winters.  According to the Köppen Climate Classification system, Grosse Pointe has a humid continental climate, abbreviated "Dfb" on climate maps.

Demographics

2010 census
As of the census of 2010, there were 5,421 people, 2,236 households, and 1,481 families residing in the city. The racial makeup of the city was 93.2% White, 3.3% African American, 0.1% Native American, 1.6% Asian, 0.1% Pacific Islander, 0.2% from other races, and 1.5% from two or more races. Hispanic or Latino of any race were 1.8% of the population.

There were 2,236 households, of which 33.0% had children under the age of 18 living with them, 54.9% were married couples living together, 8.9% had a female householder with no husband present, 2.4% had a male householder with no wife present, and 33.8% were non-families. 30.2% of all households were made up of individuals, and 14% had someone living alone who was 65 years of age or older. The average household size was 2.42 and the average family size was 3.06.

The median age in the city was 44.7 years. 26.4% of residents were under the age of 18; 4.9% were between the ages of 18 and 24; 19.3% were from 25 to 44; 33.4% were from 45 to 64; and 16.1% were 65 years of age or older. The gender makeup of the city was 46.4% male and 53.6% female.

2000 census
As of the census of 2000, there were 5,670 people, 2,388 households, and 1,559 families residing in the city. The racial makeup of the city was 97.18% White, 0.79% African American, 0.07% Native American, 1.04% Asian, 0.02% Pacific Islander, 0.30% from other races, and 0.60% from two or more races. Hispanic or Latino of any race were 1.46% of the population. 19.9% were of German, 14.8% Irish, 13.9% English, 7.8% Polish and 7.2% Italian ancestry according to Census 2000. The largest reported religious affiliation was Roman Catholic.

There were 2,388 households, out of which 30.8% had children under the age of 18 living with them, 56.7% were married couples living together, 7.1% had a female householder with no husband present, and 34.7% were non-families. 31.1% of all households were made up of individuals, and 13.8% had someone living alone who was 65 years of age or older.  The average household size was 2.37 and the average family size was 3.02.

In the city, the population was spread out, with 25.4% under the age of 18, 4.3% from 18 to 24, 25.3% from 25 to 44, 29.3% from 45 to 64, and 15.7% who were 65 years of age or older.  The median age was 42 years. For every 100 females, there were 88.1 males. For every 100 females age 18 and over, there were 83.2 males.

The median income for a household in the city was $89,492, and the median income for a family was $101,889. Males had a median income of $79,637 versus $44,167 for females. The per capita income for the city was $53,942.  About 2.2% of families and 5.8% of the population were below the poverty line, including 1.3% of those under age 18 and 1.9% of those age 65 or over.

Downtown development
The City's Master Plan permits additional growth in downtown Grosse Pointe, also known as "The Village", allowing an expansion of the shopping- and amenities-focused district. In particular, two lots (on either side of St. Clair Avenue) currently used for municipal parking directly north of the current row of retail are the focus of planned development.

The former Jacobson's Department Store building along Kercheval, west of St. Clair, has been completely redeveloped. Upper-floor office space accompanies a slate of new retailers, including a Trader Joe's grocery occupying specialized space in the renovated building. In addition, a new building rose in 2011 to replace the former Kroger grocery store at the corner of Kercheval and Notre Dame Street.

Education
Grosse Pointe Public School System operates public schools.

Lewis Maire Elementary School in Grosse Pointe and Pierce Middle School in Grosse Pointe Park serve the western half of the city, while Père Gabriel Richard Elementary School and Brownell Middle School, both in Grosse Pointe Farms, serve the other half. All residents are zoned to Grosse Pointe South High School in Grosse Pointe Farms. Grosse Pointe Woods and Grosse Pointe Shores attend Grosse Pointe North High School

The Grosse Pointes are also home to one of the state's top private/independent schools, University Liggett School in Grosse Pointe Woods. Liggett serves grades prekindergarten through 12th grade. Liggett is known for its progressive curriculum, starting with the Reggio Emilia approach in prekindergarten and lower school grades.

Notable places

 The Village shopping district, Kercheval Road between Neff and Cadieux.
 Neff Park, at the foot of University Place. A restricted-access park with pier and harbor on southern Lake St. Clair, pool, playgrounds, picnic areas, volleyball courts, and ice-skating in the winter.
 George Elworthy Field. A city park with tennis courts, sports fields (including Little League Baseball diamonds), and playgrounds, within walking distance of the Village. Bounded by Neff Rd., St. Clair Ave., Waterloo St., and Charlevoix Street.
 Ralph Harmon Booth House, 315 Washington Road. The largest house in the city; an architecturally significant English Revival mansion, designed by Marcus Burrows, in the midst of other historic homes. The former home of the President of Booth Newspapers, who served as U.S. Minister to Denmark and a key Detroit Institute of Arts philanthropist, Ralph Booth, the brother of George G. Booth.
 Henry Tiffany Cole House, 394 Lakeland at Maumee. A large, distinctive Tudor mansion.
 John M. Dwyer House, 372 Lakeland. A huge Georgian Colonial mansion, part of a row of mansions on lower Lakeland Ave.
 Waterman House, 330 Lincoln. A stucco Georgian mansion built in 1911 at the corner of Maumee. Once the home of the inventor of the outboard boat motor. Features a chapel imported from England.
 The Murray Sales House, 251 Lincoln. An Italian villa in white stucco off Jefferson Avenue built-in 1917. Designed by the famed Louis Kamper, the architect of some downtown Detroit skyscrapers, among other buildings.
 "Rosecroft," the B. Tobin House, at 266 Lakeland Ave. A unique 1912 Tudor designed by Albert Kahn.
 "Woodley Green," the Benson Ford House, on the shore of Lake St. Clair. A notable 1934 Georgian/Regency designed by Hugh T. Keyes.
 Several blocks of mansions and architecturally significant houses (including some townhouses) on Lincoln, Washington, Roosevelt, Rivard, University, and Lakeland, south of Kercheval.
 Historic smaller homes, among the oldest in the city, along St. Clair Ave. and Notre Dame Ave., especially near Kercheval.
 Several blocks of houses representing the upscale residential architecture of the 1910-1930 period.
 Dodge Place, a mid-century subdivision built on part of the former Horace and Anna Dodge mansion(s) site.
 Fisher Road retail district (between St. Paul and Maumee), across from Grosse Pointe South High School.
 Mack Avenue business district, along the length of Mack Avenue in Grosse Pointe, constituting the border with Detroit.
 Maire Elementary School (Cadieux near Kercheval), the only one of the Grosse Pointe Public Schools within the small city.
 Grosse Pointe Unitarian Church (Maumee near Neff), the only church within the one square mile city.

Notable people

 Gregg Alexander, singer, frontman of the New Radicals
 Anita Baker, singer, winner of eight Grammys
 Edward A. Batchelor, early 20th Century journalist, resided in Grosse Pointe
 Miguel Cabrera, MLB player for Florida Marlins and Detroit Tigers
 Roy D. Chapin Jr., chairman and CEO of American Motors Company
 Laura Devon, actress
 Jeffrey Eugenides, Pulitzer-Prize winning author, attended University Liggett School
 Edsel Ford, automaker, resided and died in Grosse Pointe Shores
 Edsel Ford II, automaker, resides in Grosse Pointe Farms
 Elena Ford, auto executive, granddaughter of Henry Ford II, resides in Grosse Pointe Farms
 Henry Ford II, auto executive, lived in Grosse Pointe
 Martha Firestone Ford, principal owner and chairwoman of the Detroit Lions of the National Football League (NFL), widow of William Clay Ford Sr., and daughter of Harvey S. Firestone Jr.
 William Clay Ford Sr., principal owner and chairman of the Detroit Lions of the National Football League (NFL), resided and died in Grosse Pointe Shores
 Chris Getz, professional baseball player, Toronto Blue Jays
 Kirk Gibson, MLB player for Detroit Tigers and Los Angeles Dodgers, former manager of Arizona Diamondbacks, resides in Grosse Pointe
 Jared Lee Gosselin, Grammy-winning music producer
 Julie Harris, actress, Emmy, Tony and Grammy Award winner and Oscar nominee, born in Grosse Pointe
 Edward Herrmann, actor, attended Grosse Pointe High School
 Hal Hudson, professional baseball pitcher, Chicago White Sox and St. Louis Browns
 John Hughes, American film director, producer, and screenwriter famous for numerous films including Home Alone, Ferris Bueller's Day Off, Sixteen Candles, grew up in Grosse Pointe
 Julanne Johnston, silent-film actress
 Bill Kennedy, actor, TV Talk Show Host (Bill Kennedy at the Movies, channel 50, 1pm, in the 60's thru 80's), resided in Grosse Pointe
 Aaron Krickstein, professional tennis player
 David Legwand, NHL hockey player
 Matt Letscher, actor
 Lisa LoCicero, actress, General Hospital
 John Lowery, guitarist for Rob Zombie, David Lee Roth, Marilyn Manson, Rob Halford's 2wo, and K.d. lang, among others
 Debbie Massey, LPGA Tour golfer, twice winner of Women's British Open, born in Grosse Pointe
 Michael McCarron, professional ice hockey player
 Jim Miller, former NFL quarterback
 Carly Piper, swimmer, gold medalist at 2004 Athens Olympics
 J.K. Simmons, actor, Academy Award winner for Whiplash, born in Grosse Pointe
 Charles M. Swift, lawyer, businessman, founder of Meralco and several railroads
 Mark Tremonti, guitarist for Creed and Alter Bridge
 Corey Tropp, NHL hockey player
 Zach Werenski, Hockey player in the Columbus Blue Jackets organization
 Meg White, member of the White Stripes, is from Grosse Pointe Farms
 Ralph Wilson, owner of the Buffalo Bills, resided and died in Grosse Pointe Shores

See also
Grosse Pointe Yacht Club
Lake Saint Clair (North America)
Grosse Pointe Blank

References

Further reading
  - article on downtown redevelopment

External links

 City of Grosse Pointe official website
Grosse Pointe Historical Society
Lewis Maire Elementary School
Grosse Pointe Public Library
Grosse Pointe News - weekly newspaper
Grosse Pointe War Memorial (Russell Alger Mansion)

Cities in Wayne County, Michigan
Metro Detroit
Populated places established in 1880
1880 establishments in Michigan
Michigan populated places on Lake St. Clair